Franciscan Province of Bosna Srebrena (also Bosna Argentina; officially ) is a province of the Franciscan order of the Catholic Church in Bosnia and Herzegovina. Their headquarters are currently in Sarajevo.

Monasteries and locations

The Province of Bosna Srebrena includes the monasteries in:

 Bosnia and Herzegovina at:
 Sarajevo:

Sarajevo / Bistrik – samostan sv. Ante,

Sarajevo / Kovačići – samostan Uzvišenje sv. Križa i svetište Nikole Tavelića,

Sarajevo / Nedžarići – samostan sv. Pavla;

 Rest of Bosnia and Herzegovina:

Visoko – Samostan sv. Bonaventure,

Franciscan monastery in Kraljeva Sutjeska – Samostan i župa sv. Ivana,

Franciscan monastery in Fojnica – Samostan i župa Svetoga Duha,

Guča Gora Monastery – Samostan i župa sv. Franje Asiškog,

Dubrave – samostan sv. Ante i župa Bezgrešnog Začeća,

Livno / Gorica – samostan sv. Petra i Pavla,

Franciscan monastery of Saint Luke, Jajce – Samostan sv. Luke i župa Uznesenja Marijina,

Olovo – samostan Uznesenja Marijina,

Franciscan monastery Saint Catharine, Kreševo – samostan sv. Katarine i župa Uznesenja Marijina,

Petrićevac – samostan Presv. Trojstva i župa sv. Ante Padovanskoga,

Plehan – samostan i župa sv. Marka,

Rama / Šćit – samostan i župa Uznesenja Marijina,

Tolisa – samostan i župa Uznesenja Marijina,

Tuzla – samostan i župa sv. Petra apostola,

Samostan sestara Klarisa u Brestovskom;

 Croatia:

Zagreb / Podsused – samostan sv. Ilije;

 Serbia:

Beograd – Samostan i župa Sv. Ante Padovanskog;

Đakovica – Samostan i župa sv. Petra i Pavla.

History

The Franciscans order arrived in Bosnia in the later half of the 13th century, aiming to eradicate the teachings of the Bosnian Church. The first Franciscan vicariate in Bosnia was founded in 1339/40. The province itself is the only institution in Bosnia and Herzegovina which has operated uninterruptedly since the Middle Ages.

The Franciscan order was allowed by Sultan Mehmed II the Conqueror in the Ottoman Empire in 1463, after the Ottoman conquest of Bosnia and Herzegovina. Friar Anđeo Zvizdović of the Monastery in Fojnica received the oath on May 28 of 1463 at the camp of Milodraž.

The Ahdname of Milodraž stated:

The original edict is still kept in the Franciscan monastery in Fojnica. It is one of the oldest surviving documents on religious freedom. In 1971, the United Nations published a translation of the document in all the official U.N. languages. The ferman was republished by the Ministry of Culture of Turkey for the 700th anniversary of the foundation of the Ottoman State.

Without a regular hierarchy of bishops in place, the diocesan clergy fell into decline and disappeared by the mid-19th century.  To support the local church which was functioning without resident bishops, the Holy See founded an Apostolic Vicariate for Bosnia in 1735, and assigned Franciscans as apostolic vicars to direct it.  The Franciscan Province of Bosna Srebrena was restructured to correspond to the borders of Ottoman rule in 1757; it split in 1846, when friars from the Kresevo monastery broke off to found the monastery at Siroki Brijeg.  A separate Franciscan jurisdiction (a "custody") was established for Herzegovina in 1852. Pope Leo XIII raised it to the status of a province (the Province of the Assumption of the Blessed Virgin Mary) in 1892.

20th century

World War II
With the outbreak of World War II in Yugoslavia and the installation of the Nazi-backed Independent State of Croatia puppet state led by the Ustaše, the Bosnian Franciscans' relationship with the regime became complicated. Some Franciscans, such as Alojzije Mišić and others, opposed the Ustaše's genocide policies. Others such as Archbishop Šarić enthusiastically supported the regime, while some monks like Miroslav Filipović participated in the atrocities themselves. Several key Ustaše officials, like Andrija Artuković were educated at Franciscan parochial schools, mainly in Široki Brijeg. Instructions of the Superiors of the Franciscan order based in Rome issued in the summer of 1941 forbade Franciscan friars to participate in Ustaše activities, and the heads of the Bosnian sector believed in following these instructions. Still, the Franciscans of Bosnia and Herzegovina would play a leading role in the slaughter and forced conversions of Serbs with Sarajevo becoming a center of the Catholic conversion campaign.

After the war, contrary to their Herzegovinian counterparts, the Bosnian Franciscans held open dialogues with the communists despite them killing 47 of their members. The Franciscan Province of Bosnia organized a service at the Church of Saint Anthony in Sarajevo on 15 May 1945 as a gratitude for the Partisan victory.

See also
 Franciscan Province of the Assumption of the Blessed Virgin Mary, the other Franciscan province in Bosnia and Herzegovina

References

External links

  

Bosna Srebrena
Catholic Church in Bosnia and Herzegovina
 *
Religion in medieval Bosnia and Herzegovina
Religion in Bosnia and Herzegovina during Ottoman period